The 1946 Michigan State Spartans football team was an American football team that represented Michigan State College as an independent during the 1946 college football season. In their 13th and final season under head coach Charlie Bachman, the Spartans compiled a 5–5 record and were outscored by a total of 202 to 181. The 1946 Spartans lost their annual rivalry game with Michigan by a 55 to 7 score. In intersectional play, the Spartans beat Penn State (19–16), Maryland (26-14), and Washington State (26-20), but lost to Boston College (34–20), Mississippi State (6–0), and Kentucky (39–14).  

George Guerre led Michigan State, ranked 13th nationally with 633 rushing yards, and averaged 7.03 rushing yards per carry. 

In mid-December 1946, Michigan State hired Clarence Munn to replace Bachman as head coach.

Schedule

Game summaries

Michigan

On November 9, 1946, Michigan State lost to Michigan by a score of 55 to 7. With attendance at 77,134, the game drew the largest crowd to that date in the history of the Michigan–Michigan State football rivalry. Michigan scored twice in each quarter. Michigan State's touchdown came on a pass from Horace Smith to Frank Waters covering 77 yards in the third quarter. Michigan gained 500 yards in the game, 293 on the ground and 207 in the air. Michigan was held to 212 yards of which only 47 yards were gained by rushing.

After the season

The 1947 NFL Draft was held on December 16, 1946. The following Spartans were selected.

References

Michigan State
Michigan State Spartans football seasons
Michigan State Spartans football